West Textures is an album by Texas-based folk singer-songwriter Robert Earl Keen (credited on this album as Robert Earl Keen, Jr.), released in the United States in 1989 on Sugar Hill. It is notable for the track "The Road Goes On Forever" which has become one of Keen's signature songs and has been covered by other bands including the country supergroup The Highwaymen.

Track listing
All tracks written by Robert Earl Keen, except where noted
"Sing One For Sister" – 3:03
"The Road Goes On Forever" – 5:01
"Maria" – 4:30
"Sonora's Death Row" (Kevin Farrell) – 4:31
"Mariano" – 3:31
"Don't Turn Out The Light" (Bob McDill) – 2:51
"Leavin' Tennessee" – 2:54
"Jennifer Johnson & Me" (Fred Koller, Shel Silverstein) – 3:20
"The Five Pound Bass" – 2:57
"It's The Little Things" – 2:21
"Love's A Word I Never Throw Around" – 3:00

Production
Produced By Jim Rooney
Engineer: Bil VornDick
Mastering: Jim Lloyd

Personnel
Robert Earl Keen: Lead Vocal, Rhythm Guitar
Mark Howard: Rhythm & Lead Guitar
Jonathan Yudkin: Fiddle & Mandolin, Backing & Harmony Vocal
Roy Huskey, Jr.: Electric & Upright Bass
Joey Miskulin: Accordion
Pat McInerney: Drums, Percussion

References

1989 albums
Robert Earl Keen albums
Sugar Hill Records albums